İstisu (till 2018 Müqtədir, also, Mukhtadir or Muxtedir) is a coastal town and municipality in the Khachmaz Rayon of Azerbaijan.  It has a population of 2,236.  The municipality consists of the İstisu town and Vələmir village.

References 

Populated places in Khachmaz District